ASO or Aso  may refer to:

Geography
 Aso (river), a river in Italy
 Aso River, in Democratic Republic of the Congo
 Aso, Kumamoto, Japan
 Asō, Ibaraki, a former Japanese town located in Namegata District that is now part of the city of Namegata
 Mount Aso, a mountain in Japan
 Aso Rock, a large outcrop on the outskirts of Abuja, Nigeria

Ships
 Japanese cruiser Aso (1905–1932)
 Aso-class patrol vessel, a class of large patrol vessels of the Japan Coast Guard, named after Mount Aso

As abbreviation

Medicine
 Allele-specific oligonucleotide
 Antisense oligonucleotide
 Anti-streptolysin O
 Arterial switch operation
 Arteriosclerosis obliterans

Orchestras
 Adelaide Symphony Orchestra
 Albany Symphony Orchestra
 American Symphony Orchestra
 Amman Symphony Orchestra (since 2015, the JOrchestra)
 Annapolis Symphony Orchestra
 Antwerp Symphony Orchestra
 Appalachian Symphony Orchestra
 Arkansas Symphony Orchestra
 Atlanta Symphony Orchestra
 Austin Symphony Orchestra

Technology
 Analogue switch/sign-off, part of the digital television transition
 App store optimization

Other uses
 ASO, general secondary education (Algemeen Secundair Onderwijs in Dutch) in Belgium
 Aso (Pugad Baboy story arc), part of the Philippine comic strip Pugad Baboy
 ASO, another name for the arcade game Alpha Mission
 Academy Sports + Outdoors, American retail chain
 Address Supporting Organization, an Internet-protocol advisory group affiliated with ICANN
 Administrative services organization, a company that provides human-resources and other administrative functions to client companies
 Amaury Sport Organisation, organiser of the Tour de France and other sporting events
 ASO or "anvil-shaped object", a cheap anvil made of inferior materials
 Arbitrary slice ordering, an algorithm for loss prevention during image or video compression
 App store optimization, a process of improving the visibility of a mobile app in an App Store
 Areostationary orbit, a circular synchronous orbit around Mars in the equatorial plane
 Australian Screen Online, online database of the Australian National Film and Sound Archive

People with the surname
 Aso (surname)

See also
 Aso Villa, the office and residence of the Nigerian President